Archery was competed at the 1986 Asian Games in Seoul, South Korea from 27 to 30 September. The competition included only recurve events.

Medalists

Men

Women

Medal table

References
Results 27 September
Results 29 September
Results 30 September

 
1986 Asian Games events
1986
Asian Games
International archery competitions hosted by South Korea